Lischkeia mahajangaensis is a species of sea snail, a marine gastropod mollusk in the family Eucyclidae.

Description
The shell grows to a height of 25 mm.

Distribution
This species occurs in the Indian Ocean off Madagascar.

References

 Vilvens C. 2002. Description of Lischkeia mahajangaensis n.sp. (Gastropoda: Trochidae: Eucyclinae: Calliotropini) from East Madagascar. Novapex 3(4): 127-131
 Bouchet, P.; Fontaine, B. (2009). List of new marine species described between 2002-2006. Census of Marine Life

External links
 

mahajangaensis
Gastropods described in 2002